Schrankia aurantilineata is a species of moth of the family Erebidae first described by George Hampson in 1896. It is found in Sri Lanka.

References

Moths described in 1896
Hypenodinae